Quinn Wilmans (born 8 December 1982 in Kempton Park, South Africa) is a South African retired figure skater. She is the 2001 South African national silver medalist and the 2002 national bronze medalist.

Results

External links
 

1982 births
Living people
People from Kempton Park, Gauteng
South African female single skaters
Sportspeople from Gauteng